The 8th European Men's and Women's Artistic Gymnastics Individual Championships took place from 10 to 14 April 2019 at the Netto Arena in Szczecin, Poland. No team competition was held.

Schedule 
All times are in Eastern European Summer Time (UTC+03:00).

Wednesday, 10 April 2019
10:00 – 19:40 MAG Qualifying

Thursday, 11 April 2019
10:00 – 19:30 WAG Qualifying

Friday, 12 April 2019
13:00 – 15:45 MAG All-Around Final
17:30 – 19:30 WAG All-Around Final

Saturday, 13 April 2019
13:30 – 16:00 Apparatus Finals Day 1

Sunday, 14 April 2019
13:30 – 16:00 Apparatus Finals Day 2

Medals summary

Medalists

Medal standings

Overall

Men

Women

Men's results

Individual all-around 
Andrey Likhavitski of Belarus and Israel's Alexander Shatilov withdrew and were replaced by reserves Yevgen Yudenkov of Ukraine and Joel Plata of Spain.

Oldest and youngest competitors

Floor 
Great Britain's Dominick Cunningham withdrew due to his injury in qualifications. He was replaced by first reserve Nicola Bartolini of Italy.

Oldest and youngest competitors

Pommel horse 
Oldest and youngest competitors

Rings 
Oldest and youngest competitors

Vault 
Oldest and youngest competitors

Parallel bars 
Oldest and youngest competitors

Horizontal bar 
Great Britain's James Hall was unable to finish his routine due to a shoulder injury from a fall.

Oldest and youngest competitors

Women's results

Individual all-around 

Oldest and youngest competitors

Vault 
Oldest and youngest competitors

Uneven bars 

Oldest and youngest competitors

Balance beam 
Oldest and youngest competitors

Floor 
Oldest and youngest competitors

'''

Qualification

Men's results

Individual all-around

Floor

Pommel horse

Rings

Vault

Parallel bars

Horizontal bar

Women's results

Individual all-around

Vault

Uneven bars

Balance beam

Floor

References

External links 
 
 8th individual European Championships in Artistic Gymnastics in European Union of Gymnastics website

European Artistic Gymnastics Championships
European Artistic Gymnastics Championships
Gymnastics
2019 in Polish sport
European Artistic Gymnastics Championships
International gymnastics competitions hosted by Poland
Sport in Szczecin